He Mengfu (1911 – 10 May 1945) was a Chinese film and theatre director from Wujin, Jiangsu. A 1931 graduate of the Peking University drama department, he was associated with Shanghai-based Lianhua Film Company during the 1930s, as well as many theatre organizations and institutions, including the Nanjing National Theatre Academy.

He died on 10 May 1945 in Chongqing.

References

Further reading

External links

He Mengfu at the Chinese Movie Database

1911 births
1945 deaths
Film directors from Jiangsu
Peking University alumni
Screenwriters from Jiangsu
Writers from Changzhou